Adiaphorostreptidae is a family of millipedes belonging to the order Spirostreptida.

Genera:
 Adiaphorostreptus Hoffman, 1977

References

Spirostreptida